Wedding in the Eccentric Club (German: Die Hochzeit im Excentricclub) is a 1917 German silent crime action film directed by Joe May and starring Harry Liedtke, Käthe Haack and Bruno Kastner. It was part of the long-running series of Joe Deebs detective films.

Cast
 Harry Liedtke as Joe Deebs
 Käthe Haack as Junges Mädchen, van Hoops Tochter		
 Bruno Kastner as van Hoops Neffe, der Erbe
 Magda Madeleine 	
 Esther Carena
 Ethel Hansa as 
 Hermann Picha 
 Wilhelm von Haxthausen 	
 Paul Westermeier

References

Bibliography
 Thomas, Douglas B. The Early History of German Motion Pictures, 1895-1935. Thomas International, 1999.

External links

1917 films
Films of the German Empire
German silent feature films
Films directed by Joe May
German black-and-white films
German crime films
1917 crime films
1910s German films
1910s German-language films